Hermann Anton Haus (August 8, 1925 – May 21, 2003) was a Slovene-American physicist, electrical engineer, and Institute Professor at the Massachusetts Institute of Technology. Haus' research and teaching ranged from fundamental investigations of quantum uncertainty as manifested in optical communications to the practical generation of ultra-short optical pulses. In 1994, the Optical Society of America recognized Dr. Haus' contributions with its Frederic Ives Medal, the society's highest award. Haus authored or co-authored eight books (see section below), published nearly 300 articles, and presented his work at virtually every major conference and symposium on laser and quantum electronics and quantum optics around the world. He was awarded the National Medal of Science in 1995 and was adopted into RPI's Alumni Hall of Fame in 2007.

He was a grandson of the Austrian admiral Anton Haus. His father, Otto Maximilian Haus, was a leading Slovenian doctor who investigated tuberculosis. The tomb of his great-grandmother Marija Haus (Walter) is still in Bubnjarci, Croatia.

Books authored or co-authored by Prof. Haus 
H. A. Haus and R. B. Adler, Circuit Theory of Linear Noisy Networks (The MIT Press, 1959).
H. A. Haus, Noise in Electron Devices (The MIT Press, 1959)
H. A. Haus and J. P. Penhune, Case Studies in Electromagnetism: Problems with Solutions (Wiley, 1960).
P. Penfield and H. A. Haus, Electrodynamics of Moving Media (The MIT Press, 1967).
H. A. Haus, Waves and Fields in Optoelectronics (Prentice Hall, Incorporated, 1984).
H. A. Haus and J. R. Melcher, Electromagnetic Fields and Energy (Prentice Hall, 1989).
H. A. Haus, Electromagnetic Noise and Quantum Optical Measurements (Springer Science & Business Media, 2000).
C. Manolatou and H. A. Haus, Passive Components for Dense Optical Integration (Springer Science & Business Media, 2002).

References

External links
An interview with Prof. Haus - RLE currents vol 1, no. 2, p. 7, June 1988
A Biographical Memoir by Erich P. Ippen - NAS
H. A. Haus, Reminiscence of a teacher and a researcher
Haus at the RPI Alumni Hall of Fame
MIT News Office obituary
The Tech (MIT student newspaper) obituary
The Hermann Anton Haus Fund - RLE MIT

1925 births
2003 deaths
20th-century American educators
MIT School of Engineering faculty
Massachusetts Institute of Technology alumni
Rensselaer Polytechnic Institute alumni
National Medal of Science laureates
Union College (New York) alumni
Members of the United States National Academy of Sciences
Members of the United States National Academy of Engineering
Engineers from Ljubljana
Slovenian physicists
Yugoslav emigrants to the United States